In combinatorial mathematics, a Dowling geometry, named after Thomas A. Dowling, is a matroid associated with a group. There is a Dowling geometry of each rank for each group. If the rank is at least 3, the Dowling geometry uniquely determines the group. Dowling geometries have a role in matroid theory as universal objects (Kahn and Kung, 1982); in that respect they are analogous to projective geometries, but based on groups instead of fields.

A Dowling lattice is the geometric lattice of flats associated with a Dowling geometry. The lattice and the geometry are mathematically equivalent: knowing either one determines the other. Dowling lattices, and by implication Dowling geometries, were introduced by Dowling (1973a,b).

A Dowling lattice or geometry of rank n of a group G is often denoted Qn(G).

The original definitions

In his first paper (1973a) Dowling defined the rank-n Dowling lattice of the multiplicative group of a finite field F. It is the set of all those subspaces of the vector space Fn that are generated by subsets of the set E that consists of vectors with at most two nonzero coordinates. The corresponding Dowling geometry is the set of 1-dimensional vector subspaces generated by the elements of E.

In his second paper (1973b) Dowling gave an intrinsic definition of the rank-n Dowling lattice of any finite group G. Let S be the set {1,...,n}. A G-labelled set (T, α) is a set T together with a function α: T → G. Two G-labelled sets, (T, α) and (T, β), are equivalent if there is a group element, g, such that β = gα. 
An equivalence class is denoted [T, α].
A partial G-partition of S is a set γ = {[B1,α1], ..., [Bk,αk]} of equivalence classes of G-labelled sets such that B1, ..., Bk are nonempty subsets of S that are pairwise disjoint. (k may equal 0.) 
A partial G-partition γ is said to be ≤ another one, γ*, if 
 every block of the second is a union of blocks of the first, and
 for each Bi contained in B*j, αi is equivalent to the restriction of α*j to domain Bi .

This gives a partial ordering of the set of all partial G-partitions of S. The resulting partially ordered set is the Dowling lattice Qn(G).

The definitions are valid even if F or G is infinite, though Dowling mentioned only finite fields and groups.

Graphical definitions

A graphical definition was then given by Doubilet, Rota, and Stanley (1972). We give the slightly simpler (but essentially equivalent) graphical definition of Zaslavsky (1991), expressed in terms of gain graphs.

Take n vertices, and between each pair of vertices, v and w, take a set of |G| parallel edges labelled by each of the elements of the group G. The edges are oriented, in that, if the label in the direction from v to w is the group element g, then the label of the same edge in the opposite direction, from w to v, is g−1. The label of an edge therefore depends on the direction of the edge; such labels are called gains. Also add to each vertex a loop whose gain is any value other than 1. (1 is the group identity element.) This gives a graph which is called GKno (note the raised circle).

A cycle in the graph then has a gain. The cycle is a sequence of edges, e1e2···ek. Suppose the gains of these edges, in a fixed direction around the cycle, are g1, g2, ..., gk. Then the gain of the cycle is the product, g1g2···gk. The value of this gain is not completely well defined, since it depends on the direction chosen for the cycle and on which is called the "first" edge of the cycle. What is independent of these choices is the answer to the following question: is the gain equal to 1 or not? If it equals 1 under one set of choices, then it is also equal to 1 under all sets of choices.

To define the Dowling geometry, we specify the circuits (minimal dependent sets). The circuits of the matroid are 
 the cycles whose gain is 1,
 the pairs of cycles with both gains not equal to 1, and which intersect in a single vertex and nothing else, and
 the theta graphs in which none of the three cycles has gain equal to 1.

Thus, the Dowling geometry Qn(G) is the frame matroid (or bias matroid) of the gain graph GKno (the raised circle denotes the presence of loops). 
Other, equivalent definitions are described in the article on gain graphs.

Characteristic polynomial 

One reason for interest in Dowling lattices is that the characteristic polynomial is very simple. If L is the Dowling lattice of rank n of a finite group G having m elements, then

an exceptionally simple formula for any geometric lattice.

Generalizations

There is also a Dowling geometry, of rank 3 only, associated with each quasigroup; see Dowling (1973b). This does not generalize in a straightforward way to higher ranks. There is a generalization due to Zaslavsky (2012) that involves n-ary quasigroups.

References

Peter Doubilet, Gian-Carlo Rota, and Richard P. Stanley (1972), On the foundations of combinatorial theory (VI): The idea of generating function. In: Proceedings of the Sixth Berkeley Symposium on Mathematical Statistics and Probability (Berkeley, Calif., 1970/71), Vol. II: Probability Theory, pp.\ 267–318. University of California Press, Berkeley, Calif., 1972.
T.A. Dowling (1973a), A q-analog of the partition lattice. Chapter 11 in: J.N. Srivastava et al., eds., A Survey of Combinatorial Theory (Proceedings of an International Symposium, Ft. Collins, Colo., 1971), pp. 101–115. North-Holland, Amsterdam, 1973.
T.A. Dowling (1973b), A class of geometric lattices based on finite groups. Journal of Combinatorial Theory, Series B, Vol. 14 (1973), pp. 61–86.
 Kahn, Jeff, and Kung, Joseph P.S. (1982), Varieties of combinatorial geometries. Transactions of the American Mathematical Society, Vol. 271, pp. 485–499.
Thomas Zaslavsky (1991), Biased graphs. II. The three matroids. Journal of Combinatorial Theory, Series B, Vol. 51, pp. 46–72.
Thomas Zaslavsky (2012), Associativity in multary quasigroups: The way of biased expansions.  "Aequationes Mathematicae", Vol. 83, no. 1, pp. 1–66.

Matroid theory
Finite groups
Finite fields